José Heredia may refer to:
 José-Maria de Heredia, Cuban-born French Parnassian poet
 José María Heredia y Heredia, Cuban-born poet
 José Heredia (weightlifter), Cuban weightlifter